Barwick School (or simply Barwick) is an independent, preparatory, day and boarding school for boys and girls located in Concession, Zimbabwe, Mashonaland Central, Zimbabwe. The school was opened in 1988.

Barwick School is a member of the Association of Trust Schools (ATS) and the Headmaster is a member of the Conference of Heads of Independent Schools in Zimbabwe (CHISZ).

History
The idea of a private preparatory school in Mashonaland Central began to form in the 1980s due to the rapid development of mining in the region, which was spearheaded by Anglo American. In 1984, the General Manager of Caesar Mine and Associate mines in the area met with local farmers and formed a development committee. Suitable land off Barwick road was identified for the development of Barwick School where it is situated today. The site chosen was close to power, water and easily accessible with a good road.

After capital injections, designing, engineering and building of the school through the combined effort of the farming and mining communities, Barwick School opened on 25 January 1988 with an office block, class rooms, and hostels completed. By 1991, the school's enrollment was filled to capacity, the grades being streamlined into having two classes per grade and a waiting list was formed.

Houses
Barwick has three houses, namely Horta, Mapere and Ruorka. Each of the houses have a housemaster who is in charge of all matters concerning the house.

The following table shows the list of houses and their colours:

Academics
The following subjects are offered at Barwick:

Grade 7 pupils sit for ZIMSEC examinations in English, General Paper, Mathematics and Shona, thus ending their primary education.

Sports
Sports at Barwick School include the following:

Clubs
Clubs at Barwick include the Cooking Club, Computer Club, Flying Club and Scripture Union.

See also

 List of schools in Zimbabwe

References

External links
 Barwick School Official website
 Barwick School Profile on the ATS website
 Barwick School (@BarwickSchool) on Twitter

Private schools in Zimbabwe
Co-educational schools in Zimbabwe
Day schools in Zimbabwe
Boarding schools in Zimbabwe
Educational institutions established in 1988
1988 establishments in Zimbabwe
Member schools of the Association of Trust Schools
Education in Mashonaland Central Province